Pedro de Avendaño a Spanish soldier that had arrived in Chile with the army of García Hurtado de Mendoza in 1557.  He distinguished himself in the Battle of Millarapue.  He later served in the garrison of Cañete under captain Alonso de Reinoso.  Reinoso eventually found an Indian who betrayed the location of the fugitive Mapuche toqui Caupolicán.  Avendaño, with 50 men and the traitorous Indian as a guide, marched in stormy weather into the mountains to Pilmaiquén and captured Caupolicán as he was planning a new counter-offensive against the Spanish, near the modern Antihuala, on February 5, 1558.  He brought the toqui back to Cañete where he was eventually executed by impalement at the order of corregidor Reinoso.

Given an encomienda in Purén, his bad treatment of the natives in his charge was infamous among the Mapuche.  During the short interim governorship of Rodrigo de Quiroga following the departure of Mendoza, in July 1561, Avendaño and two other Spaniards were ambushed and killed and their heads taken by a group of Mapuche under Guenupilqui near Purén.  News of this killing and the display of the heads, triggered the second great Mapuche revolt in the Arauco War.

References

Sources 
 Alonso de Góngora Marmolejo, Historia de Todas las Cosas que han Acaecido en el Reino de Chile y de los que lo han gobernado (1536-1575) (History of All the Things that Have happened in the Kingdom of Chile and of those that have governed it (1536-1575), Edición digital a partir de Crónicas del Reino de Chile, Madrid, Atlas, 1960, pp. 75–224, (on line in Spanish)
  Capítulo XXVIII
  Capítulo XXXIII
 Pedro Mariño de Lobera, Crónica del Reino de Chile , escrita por el capitán Pedro Mariño de Lobera....reducido a nuevo método y estilo por el Padre Bartolomé de Escobar. Edición digital a partir de Crónicas del Reino de Chile Madrid, Atlas, 1960, pp. 227-562, (Biblioteca de Autores Españoles ; 569-575).  Biblioteca Virtual Miguel de Cervantes (on line in Spanish)
  Capítulo XI
 Diego de Rosales,  Historia general de el Reino de Chile, Flandes Indiano, Tomo II; Benjamín Vicuña Mackenna, Impr. del Mercurio, 1878. Original from Harvard University, Digitized May 21, 2007

1561 deaths
Spanish explorers
People of the Arauco War
16th-century Spanish people
Year of birth unknown